Giridhari (Giri) Lal Tikku (18 August 1925 in Kashmir-14 August 1996) was a Kashmiri linguist and literary scholar and Professor of Persian and Asian Studies at the University of Illinois.
He was known for his works on Persian literature.

Works
 A conversation with modern Persian poets
 In confidence: dreams and dialogues
 Islam and its cultural divergence: studies in honor of Gustave E. von Grunebaum
 Nineteen ten, Writers Workshop, 1981
 Persian poetry in Kashmir, 1339-1846: an introduction

References

1925 births
1996 deaths
Kashmiri writers
University of Illinois Urbana-Champaign faculty
American literary critics